This list comprises all players who have participated in at least one league match for the Minnesota United FC since the team's first Major League Soccer season in 2017. Players who were on the roster but never appeared in a regular season game are not listed.

Players 

Note: Bold indicates current Minnesota United Player

Goalkeepers

References

 
Minnesota United FC
Association football player non-biographical articles
Minnesota United FC players